The 1948 Auburn Tigers football team represented Auburn University in the 1948 college football season. It was the Tigers' 57th overall and 16th season as a member of the Southeastern Conference (SEC). The team was led by head coach Earl Brown, in his first year, and played their home games at Cliff Hare Stadium in Auburn, the Cramton Bowl in Montgomery and Ladd Memorial Stadium in Mobile, Alabama. They finished the season with a record of one win, eight losses and one tie (1–8–1 overall, 0–7 in the SEC).

Schedule

Source: 1948 Auburn football schedule

References

Auburn
Auburn Tigers football seasons
Auburn Tigers football